Kersal Priory in the township of Kersal, also known as St Leornards, classed as an Alien priory or hermitage, was populated by Cluniac monks. The priory was dependent on Lenton in Nottinghamshire. Founded between 1145-1453, granted title by Ranulf de Gernon, 4th Earl of Chester sometime after 1143 and became denizen independent from 1392 and was dissolved in 1538. One of the buildings, Kersal Cell is still extant and is now a private residence.

See also
List of monastic houses in Greater Manchester
List of monastic houses in England

References

Alien priories in England